The Risen Christ in Glory is a 1528–1530 oil on panel painting by Rosso Fiorentino, now in the Diocesan Museum in the Città di Castello. It shows the risen Christ with (from left to right) Mary Magdalene, the Virgin Mary, Saint Anne and Mary of Egypt.

History
Rosso signed the contract for the work on 1 July 1528 in Città di Castello. It had been commissioned by the local Company of the Corpus Domini. The contract stipulated the subject as the risen Christ in glory with four saints, all above "many and diverse figures which signify, represent the people, with as many angels as he [the painter] can accommodate".

References

Paintings by Rosso Fiorentino
Paintings depicting Jesus
Paintings of the Virgin Mary
Paintings of Saint Anne
Paintings depicting Mary Magdalene
Paintings of Mary of Egypt
Paintings in Umbria
1530 paintings